Ajwa is a cultivar of the palm date that is widely grown in Medina, Saudi Arabia. It is an oval-shaped, medium-sized date with black skin. It is often consumed Iftar for Ramadan and other Islamic religious events, since it is traditionally associated with the Islamic prophet Muhammad.

Cultivation
Ajwa date plantations surround the perimeter of Medina. Thousands of tons of ajwa dates are exported annually from the Medina region.

But this cultivar is not exclusive to the city of Medina and can be grown in various locations of the Arabian peninsula and the Saharian desert.

See also
List of date cultivars

References

Date cultivars
Agriculture in Saudi Arabia
Medina
Food and drink in Islam